Wiro of Roermond, also Wiro or Wera of Utrecht (and possibly also the same as Vira of Northumbria; d. c. 700) is a Christian saint of the 8th century. His feast day is May 8.

Life
Wiro was a native of Anglo-Saxon England, probably of Northumberland. He seems to have been associated with Saint Willibrord, and to have been appointed the second bishop of Utrecht in about 739–741.

Between 746 to 747, Wiro was one of eight bishops, along with St. Boniface, who wrote a letter to Æthelbald, King of Mercia reproving him for various dissolute and irreligious acts including: stealing ecclesiastical revenue, violating church privileges, imposing forced labour on the clergy, and fornicating with nuns. The letter implored Æthelbald to take a wife and abandon the sin of lust:We therefore, beloved son, beseech Your Grace by Christ the son of God and by His coming and by His kingdom, that if it is true that you are continuing in this vice you will amend your life by penitence, purify yourself, and bear in mind how vile a thing it is through lust to change the image of God created in you into the image and likeness of a vicious demon. Remember that you were made king and ruler over many not by your own merits but by the abounding grace of God, and now you are making yourself by your own lust the slave of an evil spirit.He was a missionary and preached in the region of the Maas and the Rhine, where his legend associates him with the priest Plechelm and the deacon Otger. Later he founded St. Peter's Abbey on land given to him by Pippin II in the present Sint Odilienberg near Roermond in the Netherlands with Otger. Wiro is buried there.

It is not clear to what extent his vita is historical. It seems clear that the monastery was founded towards the end of the 7th century.

He may be identical with the missionary bishop Vira from Northumbria, mentioned by Alcuin, among others.

The Basilica of Saints Wiro, Plechelm and Otger at Sint Odilienberg is dedicated to Wiro and his companions.

Veneration

Veneration of Wiro and his two companions began early in Roermond. The monastery he founded was transferred to Roermond, in 1361, accompanied by his relics, which were lost during the Reformation. They were re-discovered later in the 16th century, and a feast day was celebrated for some years to commemorate the rediscovery. In 1881 the original grave was found in the former abbey, and most of the bones were returned to it.

Wiro's feast day is 8 May, but in Roermond 11 May. Since the Middle Ages his skull has been in Utrecht, where he was the patron saint of the bishopric. Pilgrimages are still made to his grave in Roermond.

Notes

Sources

Butler's Lives of the Saints. Collegeville, 1996 p. 44

External links
Saint Wiro in the Acta Sanctorum 
Ökumenisches Heiligenlexikon 
Catholic.org: St. Wiro

8th-century Frankish saints
Colombanian saints